Saraiki literature is the literature of the Saraiki language of Pakistani Punjab.

Overview

Khawaja Ghulam Farid (1845–1901; his famous collection is Deewan-e-Farid) and Sachal Sar Mast (1739–1829) are the most celebrated Sufi poets in Saraiki and their poems known as Kafi are still famous.

Shakir Shujabadi (Kalam-e-Shakir, Khuda Janey, Shakir Diyan Ghazlan, Peelay Patr, Munafqan Tu Khuda Bachaway, and Shakir De Dohray are his famous books) is a very well recognized modern poet.

Famous singers who have performed in Saraiki include Attaullah Khan Essa Khailwi, Pathanay Khan, Abida Parveen, Ustad Muhammad Juman, Mansoor Malangi, Talib Hussain Dard, Kamal Mahsud, and The Sketches. Many modern Pakistan singers such as Hadiqa Kiyani and Ali Zafar have also sung Saraiki folk songs.

In academia 
The Department of Saraiki, Islamia University, Bahawalpur was established in 1989 and the Department of Saraiki, Bahauddin Zakariya University, Multan was established in 2006. Saraiki is taught as a subject in schools and colleges at higher secondary, intermediate and degree level. The Allama Iqbal Open University at Islamabad, and the Al-Khair University at Bhimbir have Pakistani Linguistics Departments. They offer M.Phil. and Ph.D in Saraiki. The Associated Press of Pakistan has launched a Saraiki version of its site, as well.

Writing system 
In the province of Punjab, Saraiki is written using the Arabic-derived Urdu alphabet with the addition of seven diacritically modified letters to represent the implosives and the extra nasals. In Sindh the Sindhi alphabet is used. The calligraphic styles used are Naskh and Nastaʿlīq.

Historically, traders or bookkeepers wrote in a script known as kiṛakkī or laṇḍā, although use of this script has been significantly reduced in recent times. Likewise, a script related to the Landa scripts family, known as Multani, was previously used to write Saraiki. A preliminary proposal to encode the Multani script in ISO/IEC 10646 was submitted in 2011.

Notable people
Mehr Abdul Haq
Akbar Makhmoor

Ismail Ahmedani (1930-2007), novelist and fiction writer, author of Amar Kahani, Peet de Pandh and Chhulian

Mehr Abdul Haq (1915-1995), author of Multani Zaban Ka Urdu Se Taaluq
Richard Francis Burton (1821-1890), author of Grammar of Saraiki
Christopher Shackle, a researcher on Saraiki language

See also 
 Saraiki people
 Saraiki culture
 Saraikistan
 Sauvira Kingdom

Notes

References

Further reading
 (requires registration).

External links
 Saraiki Web Portal
 http://www.seraikigeet.com
 Aslam Rasoolpuri

 
 
Pakistani literature by language
Saraiki culture
Literature